The Oldfield Baby Great Lakes is a homebuilt sport biplane. The aircraft has many known names, including the Baby Lakes, Oldfield Baby Lakes, Baby Great Lakes, Super Baby Lakes, Super Baby Great Lakes, and Buddy Baby Lakes

Design and development
The Baby Great Lakes was designed by Barney Oldfield, and originally built by Richard Lane, to be a scaled-down homebuilt derivative of the Great Lakes Sport Trainer.

The Baby Great Lakes is built using  of steel tubing for the fuselage with aircraft fabric covering. The wings use spruce spars. The aircraft can accommodate engines ranging from the Continental A-65 to the Volkswagen air-cooled engine.

Operational history

The prototype was not intended to be produced in quantity, but enough plans were requested that the aircraft was marketed as a homebuilt design. The rights to the Baby Great Lakes were acquired by Aircraft Spruce & Specialty Co in May 1996.

Variants
Super Baby Lakes
Accommodates engines over 
Buddy Baby Lakes
Two-place variant

Specifications (Oldfield Baby Great Lakes)

See also

References

Homebuilt aircraft